ArcaMax Publishing is a privately-owned American web/email syndication  news publisher that provides editorial content, columns & features, comic strips, and editorial cartoons via email. ArcaMax also produces co-branded newsletters with corporate clients.

The company is based in Newport News, Virginia.  Its revenue comes from advertising. Potential subscribers typically come from topical banners or co-registration for related topical sites or newsletters; as this approach can be exploited by spam purveyors, the company conducts an initial source evaluation before contacting potential subscribers by email to complete a "double opt-in" circuit aimed to decrease the amount of company resources expended on un-deliverable email communications, while at the same time reducing to a minimum the number of emails sent to people who are not interested in receiving them.

History 
ArcaMax originally sold educational materials at the cost of shipping and handling. By July 2004, the company began distributing ezines, which eventually featured health and fitness, money management and automotive advice, among other topics. Their first high-profile syndicated features were Garfield and Dear Abby. Currently the company offers more than "90 comic strips, many more advice and political columnists, news headlines, videos, and games."

Around 2006, the company began the Arcamax Book Club, which delivered book chapters to subscribers via email.

Comic strips 
ArcaMax syndicates their content digitally through arrangements with other (print) syndicates, primarily Andrews McMeel Syndication (formerly Universal Uclick), Creators Syndicate, and King Features Syndicate.

 1 and Done
 9 Chickweed Lane
 Agnes
 Andy Capp
 Archie
 Arctic Circle
 Ask Shagg
 Aunty Acid
 BC
 Baby Blues
 Ballard Street
 The Barn
 Barney & Clyde
 Barney Google and Snuffy Smith
 Beetle Bailey
 Bizarro
 Blondie
 The Boondocks
 Breaking Cat News
 The Brilliant Mind of Edison Lee
 Candorville
 Carpe Diem
 Cathy
 Crankshaft
 Cul de Sac
 Curtis
 Daddy Daze
 Daddy's Home
 Dennis the Menace
 Diamond Lil
 Dilbert
 The Dinette Set
 Dog eat Doug
 Dogs of C-Kennel
 Doonesbury
 Dustin
 The Family Circus
 Flo & Friends
 For Better or For Worse
 For Heaven's Sake
 Fort Knox
 Free Range
 Garfield
 Get Fuzzy
 Ginger Meggs
 Hägar the Horrible
 Heathcliff
 Herb and Jamaal
 Hi and Lois
 Intelligent Life
 Jerry King Cartoons
 Little Dog Lost
 The Lockhorns
 Long Story Short
 Loose Parts
 Luann
 Mallard Fillmore
 Marvin
 Master Strokes: Golf Tips
 The Meaning of Lila
 Mike du Jour
 Momma
 Mother Goose and Grimm
 Mutts
 Nest Heads
 Non Sequitur
 One Big Happy
 The Other Coast
 The Pajama Diaries
 Peanuts
 Pearls Before Swine
 Pickles
 Poorly Drawn Lines
 Red and Rover
 Reply All
 Rhymes with Orange
 Rose Is Rose
 Rubes
 Rudy Park
 Rugrats
 Sarah's Scribbles
 Scary Gary
 Shoe
 Spectickles
 Speed Bump
 Strange Brew
 Take it From the Tinkersons
 Wallace the Brave
 Wee Pals
 The Wizard of Id
 Working it Out
 Wumo
 Zack Hill
 Zits

See also 
 DailyINK / Comics Kingdom
 GoComics

References

External links
 

Comic strip syndicates
Companies based in Newport News, Virginia
Publishing companies established in 1999
1999 establishments in Virginia
American companies established in 1999